Eric Carlsén (born 16 June 1982) is a Swedish curler from Sundsvall, Sweden.

Curling career 
Playing for Härnösand Curling Club, Carlsén was the Swedish national Champion for 2005 and represented Sweden as skip at the 2005 Ford World Men's Curling Championship in Victoria, British Columbia, Canada. His team finished 9th. He is a two-time silver medalist in the World Junior Curling Championships, winning silver in 2002 and 2003. He had a fifth-place finish at the 2001 Juniors. In 2008 he won the Swedish Mixed Championships together with Niklas Edin, Anette Norberg and Anna Hasselborg. The win giving them the right to represent Sweden at the European Mixed Curling Championship held in Kitzbuhel, Austria. After the Round Robin they had an impressing 7-0 Record. They lost the semifinal against Germany ending up with a Bronze medal after beating Russia 6-4 in the bronze medal game.

For the  2009-10 season, Carlsén's teammates were Per Carlsén (Skip), Nils Carlsén (Third/Second), Niklas Berggren (lead) and Mikael Norberg (lead/Third). That team won the Swedish Super League Championship 2009-2010 after defeating Niklas Edin, of Karlstad 6-5 in the final. He represented Sweden at the 2010 Capital One World Men's Curling Championship in Cortina d'Ampezzo, Italy where Sweden finished with a 4-7 record in 8th place.

Teams

References

External links

Living people
1982 births
Swedish male curlers
Swedish curling champions